"The Perfect Boy" is a single by the British band the Cure which was released on 13 August 2008 on Geffen Records in the United Kingdom and on 12 August in the United States to follow the tradition of releasing the singles on a Tuesday. The song debuted on 9 May in Fairfax, Virginia, on the band's first concert of their 4Tour's North American leg, and was played at all 27 shows. It is unrelated to "The Perfect Girl" from Kiss Me, Kiss Me, Kiss Me.

Track listing
 "The Perfect Boy (Mix 13)" – 3:23
 "Without You" – 4:11

Charts

References

The Cure songs
Songs written by Robert Smith (musician)
2008 singles
2008 songs
Geffen Records singles
Songs written by Simon Gallup
Songs written by Jason Cooper
Songs written by Porl Thompson